Acrossidius is a genus of beetles belonging to the family Scarabaeidae.

The two species are native to Southern Australia. Acrossidius tasmaniae, the black-headed cockchafer or Tasmanian grass grub, is introduced to New Zealand.

Species:

Acrossidius pseudotasmaniae 
Acrossidius tasmaniae

References

Scarabaeidae
Beetles of Australia